Rory Keenan (born 9 June 1980) is an Irish actor. On film and television he has starred in Somewhere Boy, The Duchess, Birdsong, Versailles, War & Peace, The Guard and Peaky Blinders.

Career
Keenan has performed in many National Theatre productions, as well as at BAM, New York and Wyndhams Theatre in the West End as Jamie in Long Day's Journey into Night, directed by Sir Richard Eyre. He starred at The Donmar Warehouse in Saint Joan and Welcome Home Captain Fox! 

Previous work at The Royal National Theatre includes The Kitchen, Damned By Despair and Liola, and Philadelphia, Here I Come! and Dublin Carol at the Donmar Warehouse.

He has performed many leading roles in Ireland, having worked from an early age at The Abbey Theatre, as well as the title roles in Hamlet and Macbeth, the latter of which landed him Best Actor at 11th The Irish Times Irish Theatre Awards.

In 2010, Keenan appeared in the short film The Crush, which was nominated at the Academy Awards for Best Live Action Short Film.

On television he was seen in Channel 4's Somewhere Boy, Netflix's The Duchess, BBC's Versailles, War & Peace and Peaky Blinders.

In 2022, Keenan wrote and directed his debut film Bump, which starred his wife Gemma Arterton, and was screened at the Cinequest Film & Creativity Festival in San Jose, California, and Cleveland International Film Festival. He was awarded Best Director at the British Short Film Awards 2022.

Personal life
In 2019, he married actress Gemma Arterton.

On 4 November 2022, Keenan and Arterton confirmed that they are expecting their first child together. Their son was born in December.

Filmography

Television

Film

Theatre

References

External links

The Crush - Oscar nominated Short film

1980 births
Living people
Irish actors